Kishan may refer to:

 Kishan, Iran, a village in Markazi Province, Iran
 Kishan Shrikanth, Indian actor
 Keşan, a town and district in Turkey

See also